The 2450 class was a class of diesel locomotives built by Clyde Engineering, Eagle Farm for Queensland Railways in 1979-1980.

History
The 2450 class were an evolution of the 2400 class. They differed in having air-conditioning, aluminium cabinet doors and upgraded generators.

Between 1999 and 2002, seventeen were rebuilt as 2300 class locomotives at Redbank Railway Workshops.

References

Clyde Engineering locomotives
Co-Co locomotives
Diesel locomotives of Queensland
Queensland Rail locomotives
Railway locomotives introduced in 1979
Diesel-electric locomotives of Australia
3 ft 6 in gauge locomotives of Australia